The Techniker Beach Tour was a series of professional beach volleyball tournaments held annually in Germany. Prior to the 2018 season, it was known as the Smart Beach Tour. The tour is organized by the German Volleyball Association, and each season ends with the German Beach Volleyball Championships held at Timmendorfer Beach.

History

The Smart Beach Tour began in 2006, replacing the German Masters and Cups series that began in 1993.

German Beach Volleyball Championships
The German Beach Volleyball Championships are held at the end of each Techniker Beach Tour season at Timmendorfer Beach.

Men's results

Women's results

References

External links

Official website
Techniker Beach Tour at German Volleyball Association

Beach volleyball in Germany
Beach volleyball competitions